Siopawman (literally, "Steamed bun Man") was a Filipino comedic superhero. It was also the title of the first comic strip created by Filipino cartoonist Lauro "Larry" Zarate Alcala after World War II.

Siopawman first appeared in Halakhak Komiks ("halakhak" means laughter in Tagalog) in 1947. Siopawman was described as a “Superman parody”. After Halakhak, Siopawman became a feature series in the pages of Philippines Daily Express from 1972 to 1983. Siopawman reappeared in the reborn Daily Express in 2002.

Siopawman was described by writer Karl Gillespie as an “ugly”, big-nosed, fat-bodied and bald-headed superhero. His costume had an “S” mark on the chest. The super-abilities of Siopawman included being bulletproof and being “immune from normal humans”. Siopawman also had a sidekick named Okboy, who often addressed Siopawman as “Siops”. Although Siopawman's real identity is unknown, his enemies include Jelloman, Man-Hid, She-Mangot, She-Pilyo, She-Bat, She-Pon, She-Feet, Chopperman, Wesley "Kulang-Kulang" Moreno, Gene "Nguso" Castro, Gabrael "Mongoloid" Santos, Rene Jose "Ulo" Dalupan, and Marc Christian "Aspalto" Ontiveros.  Siopawman is regarded as the first humorous superhero in the Philippines, but not as the "first true Filipino superhero".

See also
Ipo-ipo
Varga
Lagim
Darna
Captain Barbell
Voltar

References

Fictional Filipino people
1947 comics debuts
Comics superheroes
Philippine comic strips
Filipino superheroes
Filipino comics characters
Male characters in comics